Kåre Becker (born 27 January 1978) is a former professional footballer who played as a forward.

Career
Born in Zambia to a Malawian father and Zimbabwean mother, Becker moved to the Netherlands at the age of 5 after living in Northern Ireland and Norway.

In 2000, Becker was loaned to Heracles Almelo in the Dutch second division. At the end of the 2000–01 season, when asked what he wanted to earn during new contract negotiations, he asked for time to think. Two days later, however, the local newspaper declared that the contract renewal was "halted due to excessive salary requirements".

In 2001, Becker signed for another second division side, PEC Zwolle. However, during the season, manager  was replaced by Peter Boeve, who treated him poorly and even assigned him a different locker room. As a result, he left at the end of 2001–02.

For 2004–05, Becker signed for Eintracht Nordhorn in the German fourth division, but did not play well having "greatly underestimated German football".

References

External links
 

Living people
1978 births
Zambian emigrants to the Netherlands
Zambian people of Malawian descent
Zambian people of Zimbabwean descent
Dutch people of Malawian descent
Dutch people of Zimbabwean descent
Zambian footballers
Dutch footballers
Association football forwards
Eredivisie players
Eerste Divisie players
FC Twente players
Heracles Almelo players
PEC Zwolle players
Eintracht Nordhorn players